Jordpuls ("Pulse of the Earth") is the seventh full-length album by Swedish folk metal band Vintersorg. As with the previous album Solens rötter, the lyrics are all in Swedish. This is the first of a planned four-album concept series based on the elements.

Track listing

Personnel

Vintersorg
Andreas Hedlund  - all vocals, acoustic, rhythm and lead guitars, keyboards, bass, Hammond organ, drum programming, loops and editing
Mattias Marklund - lead and rhythm guitars

Production
Arranged, produced and edited by Vintersorg

References

Vintersorg albums
2011 albums
Napalm Records albums